English singer-songwriter Adele has received various awards and nominations. She is the recipient of twelve Brit Awards, an Academy Award, a Primetime Emmy Award, a Golden Globe Award, sixteen Grammy Awards, eighteen Billboard Music Awards, five American Music Awards, and two Ivor Novello Awards for Songwriter of the Year.

Adele signed a contract with the record label XL Recordings in September 2006. She won the BBC Sound of 2008, an annual poll awarded to recognise newcomers in the music industry. Later in the same year, she won the Brits Critics' Choice, and released her debut album 19 to international success. Adele named the Best New Artist at the 51st Annual Grammy Awards, while "Chasing Pavements" – received three nominations for Record of the Year, Song of the Year, and Best Female Pop Vocal Performance, winning the later award. Her debut single "Hometown Glory" earned another nomination for Best Female Pop Vocal Performance at the 52nd Annual Grammy Awards.

Adele's second studio album 21 was released in January 2011 and held the top position for 24 weeks in the United States. Three of its singles"Rolling in the Deep", "Someone like You", and "Set Fire to the Rain"reached number one on the Billboard Hot 100. The former won three Grammy Awards – Record of the Year, Song of the Year, and Best Short Form Music Video. 21 won Album of the Year and Best Pop Vocal Album. "Someone like You" and "Set Fire to the Rain" won Best Pop Solo Performance at the 54th and 55th Annual Grammy Awards, respectively. Adele was awarded several other accolades, including the Echo Music Award for Album of the Year, and won in 12 Billboard Music Award categories. In 2012, she released "Skyfall", a song of the 2012 James Bond film of the same name. The song won a Brit Award for British Single; the Academy Award, and Golden Globe for Best Original Song; and a Grammy Award. Adele received five awards at the 2016 Billboard Music Awards, including one for her third studio album 25. She also won the British Album of the Year at the 36th Brit Awards, in addition to winning three other awards. The album also won Grammy Awards for Album of the Year and Best Pop Vocal Album, and the single "Hello" received Record of the Year, Song of the Year and Best Pop Solo Performance at the 59th Annual Grammy Awards. After a six years hiatus, Adele released her fourth studio album 30 to critical acclaim and global success. The album has garnered her four nominations at the 42nd Brit Awards, including her third consecutive win for British Album of the Year. The album also received six nominations at the 65th Annual Grammy Awards, including her third consecutive nomination for Album of the Year.

Academy Awards
The Academy Awards are a set of awards given annually for excellence of cinematic achievements, and are organised by the Academy of Motion Picture Arts and Sciences (AMPAS). The annual Oscar presentation has been held since 1929. Adele has received 1 award from 1 nomination.

!
|-
!scope="row"| 2013
| "Skyfall"
| Best Original Song
| 
| style="text-align:center;"|
|}

American Music Awards
The American Music Awards (AMAs) is an annual music awards show created by Dick Clark in 1973. Adele has won 5 awards from 14 nominations.

!
|-
!scope="row" rowspan="5"|2011
| rowspan="4"| Adele
|-
| Artist of the Year
| 
| rowspan="4" style="text-align:center;" |
|-
| Favorite Adult Contemporary Artist
| 
|-
| Favorite Pop/Rock Female Artist
| 
|-
| 21
| Favorite Pop/Rock Album
| 
|-
!scope="row"| 2012
| rowspan="3"| Adele
| rowspan="2"| Favorite Adult Contemporary Artist
| 
| style="text-align:center;" |
|-
!scope="row" rowspan="4"| 2016
| 
| rowspan="4" align="center"| 
|-
| Favorite Pop/Rock Female Artist
| 
|-
| 25
| Favorite Pop/Rock Album
| 
|-
| "Hello"
| Favorite Pop/Rock Song
| 
|-
!scope="row" rowspan="5"| 2022
| rowspan="2"| Adele
| Artist of the Year
| 
| rowspan="5" align="center"| 
|-
| Favorite Female Pop Artist
| 
|-
| rowspan="2"| "Easy on Me"
| Favorite Music Video
| 
|-
| Favorite Pop Song
| 
|-
| 30
| Favorite Pop Album
| 
|}

AIM Independent Music Awards
The AIM Independent Music Awards, hosted by the Association of Independent Music (AIM), were established in 2011 to recognise artists signed to independent record labels in the United Kingdom. Most of the categories and nominations are selected by an independent judging panel, though some are decided by the public. Adele has received 4 awards from 4 nominations.

!
|-
!scope="row" rowspan="2"|2011
| Adele
| Most Played Independent Act
| 
| rowspan="2" style="text-align:center;" | 
|-
| 21
| Best "Difficult" Second Album
| 
|-
!scope="row"| 2012
| Adele
| Most Played Independent Act
| 
| style="text-align:center;" |
|-
!scope="row"| 2016
| "Hello"
| Independent Track of the Year
| 
| style="text-align:center;"|
|}

APRA Awards (Australia)
The APRA Awards are annually held by Australasian Performing Right Association (APRA) to honor outstanding music artists and songwriters of the year. Adele has received 1 win from 2 nominations.

!
|-
!scope="row"|2012
| "Rolling in the Deep"
| rowspan="2"|International Work of the Year
|
| style="text-align:center;"|
|-
!scope="row"|2017
| "Hello"
| 
| style="text-align:center;"|
|}

Arqiva Commercial Radio Awards
The Arqiva Commercial Radio Awards is an annual award ceremony celebrating the success of the British commercial radio industry. Adele has received 1 award from 1 nomination.

!
|-
!scope="row"|2012
| Adele
|(PPL) Most Played UK Artist on Commercial Radio
|
| style="text-align:center;"|
|}

ARIA Music Awards
The ARIA Music Awards, hosted by the Australian Recording Industry Association (ARIA), recognise "excellence and innovation across all genres" of music in Australia. Adele has been nominated 5 times.

!
|-
!scope="row"| 2011
| Adele
| Most Popular International Artist
| 
| style="text-align:center;" | 
|-
!scope="row"| 2012
| 21
| rowspan="3"| Best International Artist
| 
| style="text-align:center;" | 
|-
!scope="row"| 2016
| rowspan="2"| 25
| 
| style="text-align:center;" | 
|-
!scope="row"| 2017
| 
| style="text-align:center;" | 
|-
!scope="row"| 2022
| 30
| Best International Artist
| 
| 
|}

BBC Sound of...
Sound of... is an annual BBC poll of music critics and industry figures to find the most promising new music talent. Adele has received one award.

!
|-
!scope="row"|2008
| Adele
| Sound of 2008
| 
|style="text-align:center;"|
|}

BBC Music Awards
The BBC Music Awards are the BBC's inaugural pop music awards, first held in December 2014, as a celebration of the musical achievements over the past 12 months. Adele has won four awards from five nominations.

!
|-
!scope="row" rowspan="2"| 2015
| Adele
| British Artist of the Year
| 
| rowspan="2" style="text-align: center;"| 
|-
| Adele at the BBC
| BBC Live Performance of the Year
| 
|-
!scope="row" rowspan="3"| 2016
| 25
| BBC Radio 2 Album of the Year
|
| rowspan="3" style="text-align: center;"| 
|-
| "Hello"
| BBC Song of the Year
| 
|-
| Adele
| British Artist of the Year
| 
|}

BBC Radio 1 Teen Awards
The BBC Radio 1 Teen Awards is an award show by the British radio station BBC Radio 1 to honor the top artists in music and acting of the year. Adele has won one award.

!
|-
!scope="row"|2016
| Adele
|Best British Solo Artist
|
| style="text-align:center;"|
|}

BET Awards
The BET Awards were established in 2001 by the Black Entertainment Television network to celebrate African Americans and other minorities in music, acting, sports, and other fields of entertainment. Adele has been nominated once.

!
|-
! scope="row"|2016
| Adele
| Best Female R&B/Pop Artist
| 
| style="text-align:center;"|
|}

Billboard Music Awards
The Billboard Music Awards are held to honour artists for commercial performance in the U.S., based on record charts published by Billboard. In 2012, Adele won a record-breaking 12 awards for the night. Adele has won 18 awards from 40 nominations.

!
|-
!scope="row" rowspan="20"| 2012
| rowspan="8" | Adele
| Top Artist
| 
| rowspan="20" style="text-align: center;"| 
|-
| Top Female Artist
| 
|-
| Top Billboard 200 Artist
| 
|-
| Top Hot 100 Artist
| 
|-
| Top Radio Songs Artist
| 
|-
| Top Digital Songs Artist 
| 
|-
| Top Digital Media Artist 
| 
|-
| Top Pop Artist 
| 
|-
| rowspan="7"| "Rolling in the Deep"
| Top Hot 100 Song
| 
|-
| Top Radio Song
| 
|-
| Top Rock Song
| 
|-
| Top Streaming Song (Audio)
| 
|-
| Top Alternative Song 
| 
|-
| Top Digital Song 
| 
|-
| Top Pop Song
| 
|-
| rowspan="2"|21
| Top Billboard 200 Album
| 
|-
| rowspan="2"| Top Pop Album 
| 
|-
| 19
| 
|-
| rowspan="2"| "Someone like You"
| Top Streaming Song (Video)
| 
|-
| Top Rock Song 
| 
|-
!scope="row" rowspan="5"| 2013
| rowspan="3"| Adele
| Top Billboard 200 Artist
| 
| rowspan="5" style="text-align: center;"|
|-
| Top Female Artist
| 
|-
| Top Pop Artist
| 
|-
| rowspan="2"| 21
| Top Billboard 200 Album 
| 
|-
| Top Pop Album
| 
|-
!scope="row" rowspan="9"| 2016
| rowspan="5"| Adele
| Top Artist
| 
| rowspan="9" style="text-align: center;"|
|-
| Top Female Artist
| 
|-
| Top Billboard 200 Artist
| 
|-
| Top Song Sales Artist
| 
|-
| Billboard Chart Achievement
| 
|-
| 25
| Top Billboard 200 Album
| 
|-
| rowspan="3"| "Hello"
| Top Hot 100 Song
| 
|-
| Top Selling Song
| 
|-
| Top Radio Song
| 
|-
!scope="row" rowspan="2"| 2017
| rowspan="2"| Adele
| Top Artist
| 
| rowspan="2" style="text-align: center;"|
|-
| Top Female Artist
| 
|-
!scope="row" rowspan="4"| 2022
| 30
| Top Billboard 200 Album
| 
| rowspan="4" style="text-align: center;"|
|-
| rowspan="3" |Adele
| Top Billboard 200 Artist
| 
|-
| Top Female Artist
| 
|-
| Top Song Sales Artist
| 
|}

Billboard Touring Awards
The Billboard Touring Awards is an annual meeting sponsored by Billboard magazine which also honors the top international live entertainment industry artists and professionals.

!
|-
!scope="row"|2016
| Adele
|Breakthrough
|
|

BMI Awards
The BMI Awards are held annually by Broadcast Music, Inc. to award songwriters in various genres, including pop music. Adele has received one BMI Film & TV Award, 10 BMI London Awards, and 4 BMI Pop Awards.

BMI Film & TV Awards

!
|-
!scope="row"| 2013
| "Skyfall"
| Academy Award Winners
| 
| style="text-align:center;"|
|}

BMI London Awards

!
|-
!scope="row"| 2009
| "Chasing Pavements"
| rowspan="2"| Award-Winning Songs
| 
| style="text-align:center;"|
|-
!scope="row" rowspan="4"| 2012
| rowspan="2" | "Rolling in the Deep"
| 
| rowspan="4" style="text-align:center;"|
|-
| Song of the Year
| 
|-
| "Someone like You"
| rowspan="2"| Award-Winning Songs
| 
|-
| "Set Fire to the Rain"
| 
|-
!scope="row" rowspan="3"| 2013
|rowspan="2"| "Skyfall"
| Academy Award
| 
|rowspan="3" style="text-align:center;"|
|-
| rowspan="3"| Pop Song Awards
| 
|-
| "Rumour Has It"
| 
|-
!scope="row" rowspan="2"| 2016
| "Hello"
| 
|rowspan="2" style="text-align:center;"|
|-
| "Rolling in the Deep"
| Million Performance Songs (4 Million)
| 
|}

BMI Pop Awards

!
|-
!scope="row"| 2012
| "Rolling in the Deep"
| rowspan="4"| Award-Winning Songs
| 
| style="text-align:center;"|
|-
!scope="row" rowspan="3"| 2013
| "Rumour Has It"
| 
|rowspan="3" style="text-align:center;"|
|-
| "Someone like You"
| 
|-
| "Set Fire to the Rain"
| 
|}

Bravo Otto
Established in 1957, the Bravo Otto is a German accolade presented by the magazine Bravo. The award is presented in gold, silver and bronze and, since 1996, an honorary platinum statuette presented for lifetime achievement. Adele has received one award.

!
|-
!scope="row"|2011
| Adele
|Super Singer Female (silver)
|
| style="text-align:center;"|
|}

British Academy Television Awards
The British Academy Television Awards are presented in an annual award show hosted by the British Academy of Film and Television Arts (BAFTA).They have been awarded annually since 1955. Adele has been nominated 3 times.

!
|-
!scope="row" |2016
| Adele at the BBC
| rowspan="2" |Best Entertainment Programme
| 
| style="text-align:center;"|
|-
!scope="row" rowspan="2" |2022
| rowspan="2" |An Audience with Adele (ITV)
| 
|rowspan="2" style="text-align:center;"|
|-
| Must-See Moment 
| 
|}

Brit Awards
The Brit Awards are the British Phonographic Industry's (BPI) annual pop music awards. Adele has received 12 awards from 19 nominations.

!
|-
!scope="row"|2008
|rowspan="3"|Adele
|Critics' Choice
|
|style="text-align:center;"|
|-
!scope="row" rowspan="3"|2009
|British Breakthrough Act
|
|rowspan="3" style="text-align:center;"|
|-
|British Female Solo Artist
|
|-
|"Chasing Pavements"
|British Single of the Year
|
|-
!scope="row" rowspan="3"|2012
|Adele
|British Female Solo Artist
|
|rowspan="3" style="text-align:center;"|
|-
|21
|British Album of the Year
|
|-
|"Someone like You"
|rowspan="2"|British Single of the Year
|
|-
!scope="row"|2013
|"Skyfall"
|
|style="text-align:center;"|
|-
!scope="row" rowspan="5"|2016
|rowspan="2"|Adele
|British Female Solo Artist
|
|rowspan="5" style="text-align:center;" |
|-
|Global Success Award
|
|-
|25
|British Album of the Year
|
|-
|rowspan="2"|"Hello"
|British Single of the Year
|
|-
|British Video of the Year
|
|-
!scope="row" rowspan="2"|2017
|Adele
|Global Success Award
|
|rowspan="2" style="text-align:center;"|
|-
|"Send My Love (To Your New Lover)"
|British Video of the Year
|
|-
!scope="row" rowspan="4"|2022
|rowspan="2"|Adele
|Artist of the Year
|
|rowspan="4" style="text-align:center;" |
|-
|British Pop/R&B Act
|
|-
|30
|British Album of the Year
|
|-
|"Easy on Me"
|British Single of the Year
|
|}

British LGBT Awards
The British LGBT Awards celebrate the UK's most loved LGBT personalities, innovators and companies. Adele has received one nomination.

!
|-
!scope="row"|2016
| Adele
|Music Artist
|
| style="text-align:center;"|
|}

BT Digital Music Awards
Launched in 2002, the BT Digital Music Awards were held annually in the United Kingdom. Adele has won one award from six nominations.

!
|-
!scope="row" rowspan="6"| 2011
| rowspan="2" | Adele
| Best Female Artist
| 
|rowspan="6" style="text-align:center;"|
|-
| Best Independent Artist or Group
| 
|-
| "Make You Feel My Love"
| rowspan="3"| Best Song
| 
|-
| "Someone like You"
| 
|-
| rowspan="2" | "Rolling in the Deep"
| 
|-
| Best Video
| 
|}

CMT Music Awards
Launched in 1967, the CMT Music Awards are held annually in Nashville, Tennessee. Adele has been nominated once.

!
|-
!scope="row"| 2011
| "Need You Now" 
| CMT Performance of the Year
| 
| style="text-align:center;"|
|}

Critics' Choice Movie Awards
The Critics' Choice Movie Awards are presented annually since 1995 by the Broadcast Film Critics Association for outstanding achievements in the cinema industry. Adele has received one award.

!
|-
!scope="row"| 2013
| "Skyfall"
| Best Song
| 
| style="text-align:center;"|
|}

Danish Music Awards
The Danish Music Awards (DMA) is a Danish award show. The show has been arranged by IFPI since 1989 and was originally called IFPI-prisen ("IFPI-Award") until 1991 when it changed its name to Dansk Grammy ("Danish Grammy"). The current name was given in 2001, after the American Grammy Awards registered the name Grammy as their trademark. In 2011 IFPI joined together with TV2 (Denmark) and KODA to present the awards ceremony. Adele has won one award from four nominations. 

!
|-
!scope="row"|2011
| 21
|rowspan="2"|International Album of the Year
|
| style="text-align:center;"|
|-
!rowspan="2" scope="row"|2016
| 25
|
|rowspan="2" style="text-align:center;"|
|-
| "Hello"
|rowspan="1"|International Hit of the Year
|
|-
!scope="row"|2022
|30
|International Album of the Year
|
| style="text-align:center;"|
|}

ECHO Music Awards
The ECHO Music Awards were organised in 1992 by German Phonoakademie, the cultural institute of the German Music Industry Association (BVMI), to recognise "outstanding and successful works of national and international music artists". Adele has won three awards from five nominations.

!
|-
!scope="row" rowspan="2"| 2012
| Adele
| Best International Rock/Pop Female Artist
| 
| rowspan="2" style="text-align:center;"|
|-
| 21
| Album of the Year
| 
|-
!scope="row" rowspan="3"| 2016
| Adele
| Best International Rock/Pop Female Artist
| 
| rowspan="3" style="text-align:center;"|
|-
| 25
| Album of the Year
| 
|-
| "Hello"
| Hit of the Year
| 
|}

Edinburgh TV Awards
The Edinburgh International Television Festival also known as the Edinburgh International Television Festival brought to you by YouTube and BT through sponsorship rights, is an annual media event in the UK each August that brings together all parts of the television and digital world to debate the major issues facing the industry. Adele has received one award.

!
|-
!scope="row"|2016
|Adele – Rapping to Nicki Minaj's verse on Monster
|TV Moment of The Year
|
| style="text-align:center;"|
|}

Emmy Awards

Daytime Emmy Awards
The Daytime Emmy Award is an American accolade bestowed by the New York City–based National Academy of Television Arts and Sciences in recognition of excellence in American daytime television programming. Adele has been nominated once.

!
|-
! scope="row"| 2016
| Adele in Today Show (NBC) for "Million Years Ago"
| Outstanding Musical Performance in a Talk Show/Morning Program
| 
| style="text-align:center;"|
|}

Primetime Emmy Awards
The Primetime Emmy Award is an American accolade bestowed by the Academy of Television Arts & Sciences in recognition of excellence in American primetime television programming. Adele has won one award from two nominations.

!
|-
! scope="row"| 2016
| Adele Live in New York City (NBC)
| Outstanding Variety Special
| 
| style="text-align:center;"|
|-
! scope="row"| 2022
| Adele One Night Only (CBS)
| Outstanding Variety Special (Pre-Recorded)
| 
| style="text-align:center;"|
|}

European Border Breakers Awards
The European Border Breakers Awards (EBBA) were established in 2004 by the European Commission and several companies and organisations within the European music business. Awards are presented to musicians and bands with the best selling debut albums in the European Union, not counting their home country. Adele has received one award.

!
|-
!scope="row"| 2009
| 19
| Best Album
| 
| style="text-align:center;"|
|}

Fryderyk
The Fryderyk is the annual award in Polish music. Officially created in 1994, awards are presented across three main sections – popular music, classical music, and jazz. Adele has received one award.

!
|-
!scope="row"| 2012
| 21
| International Album
| 
| style="text-align:center;"|
|}

GAFFA Awards

GAFFA Awards (Denmark)
Delivered since 1991, the GAFFA Awards (Danish: GAFFA Prisen) are a Danish award that rewards popular music by the magazine of the same name. Adele has won six awards from eight nominations. 

!
|-
!scope="row" rowspan="3" |2011
| Adele
| Best Foreign Female Act
| 
| style="text-align:center;" rowspan="3"|
|-
| 21
| Best Foreign Album
| 
|-
|"Someone Like You"
| Best Foreign Song
| 
|-
!scope="row" rowspan="2" |2015
| Adele
| Best Foreign Female Act
| 
| style="text-align:center;" rowspan="2"|
|-
| 25
| Best Foreign Album
| 
|-
!scope="row" rowspan="3" |2022
| Adele
| International Soloist of the Year
| 
| style="text-align:center;" rowspan="3"|
|-
| 30
| International Album of the Year
| 
|-
| "Easy on Me"
| International Hit of the Year
| 
|}

GAFFA Awards (Sweden)
Delivered since 2010, the GAFFA Awards (Swedish: GAFFA Priset) are a Swedish award that rewards popular music awarded by the magazine of the same name. Adele has received five awards. 

!
|-
!scope="row" rowspan="2" |2011
| Adele
| Best Foreign Solo Act
| 
| style="text-align:center;" rowspan="2"|
|-
| "Rolling in the Deep"
| Best Foreign Song
| 
|-
!scope="row" rowspan="3" |2022
| Adele
| Foreign Solo Artist of the Year
| 
| style="text-align:center;" rowspan="3"|
|-
| 30
| Foreign Album of the Year
| 
|-
| "Easy on Me"
| Foreign Song of the Year
| 
|}

Gaygalan Awards
Since 1999, the Gaygalan Awards are a Swedish accolade presented by the QX magazine. Adele has received two nominations.

!
|-
!scope="row" |2012
|"Someone Like You"
| rowspan="2"|International Song of the Year
| 
|style="text-align:center;"|
|-
! scope="row"|2022
|"Easy on Me"
| 
|style="text-align:center;"|

Glamour Women of the Year Awards
The Glamour Awards are presented annually by the Glamour magazine to women in a variety of fields. Adele has received two awards.

!
|-
!scope="row"| 2009
| rowspan="2"| Adele
| rowspan="2"|UK Solo Artist of the Year
| 
| style="text-align:center;"|
|-
!scope="row"| 2011
| 
| style="text-align:center;"|
|}

Global Awards
The Global Awards is an annual awards ceremony established by Global Media & Entertainment. It brings together all of its radio stations to award the most recognised singers and bands in different categories. Adele has been nominated three times. 

!
|-
!scope="row" rowspan="3" |2022
| rowspan="3" |Adele
| Best Female 
| 
| rowspan="3" style="text-align:center;"|
|-
| Best British Act 
| 
|-
| Best Mass Appeal Artist 
| 
|}

Golden Globe Awards
The Golden Globe Award is an accolade bestowed by the 93 members of the Hollywood Foreign Press Association (HFPA) recognising excellence in film and television, both domestic and foreign. Adele has received one award.

!
|-
!scope="row"| 2013
| "Skyfall"
| Best Original Song – Motion Picture
| 
| style="text-align:center;"|
|}

Grammis Awards
The Grammis Awards are the Swedish equivalent of the Grammy Awards, the awards were established in 1969. Adele has received one award.

!
|-
!scope="row"| 2012
| 21
| Best International Album
| 
| style="text-align:center;"|
|}

Grammy Awards
The Grammy Awards are awarded annually by The Recording Academy of the United States for outstanding achievements in the music industry. Often considered the highest music honour, the awards were established in 1958. In 2012, Adele became the second female artist to win six awards in one night. Adele was the second of three artists and first female, preceded by Christopher Cross & followed by Billie Eilish, to have won all four of the general field (Album of the Year, Best New Artist, Record of the Year and Song of the Year) awards throughout her career. In 2017, she became the only artist to, on two separate occasions, win the three general categories (Album of the Year, Record of the Year and Song of the Year) in the same ceremony. Adele has received 16 awards from 25 nominations.

!
|-
!scope="row" rowspan="4"| 2009
| Adele
| Best New Artist
| 
| rowspan="4" style="text-align:center;"|
|-
| rowspan="3" |"Chasing Pavements"
| Record of the Year
| 
|-
| Song of the Year
| 
|-
| rowspan="2"| Best Female Pop Vocal Performance
| 
|-
!scope="row"| 2010
| "Hometown Glory"
| 
| style="text-align:center;"|
|-
!scope="row" rowspan="6"| 2012
| rowspan="2"|21
| Album of the Year
| 
| rowspan="6" style="text-align:center;"|
|-
| Best Pop Vocal Album
| 
|-
| rowspan="3" |"Rolling in the Deep"
| Record of the Year
| 
|-
| Song of the Year
| 
|-
| Best Short Form Music Video
| 
|-
| "Someone like You"
| rowspan="2"| Best Pop Solo Performance
| 
|-
!scope="row"| 2013
| "Set Fire to the Rain"
| 
| style="text-align:center;"|
|-
!scope="row"| 2014
| "Skyfall" (from Skyfall)
| Best Song Written for Visual Media
| 
| style="text-align:center;"|
|-
!scope="row" rowspan="5"| 2017
| rowspan="2"|25
| Album of the Year
| 
| rowspan="5" style="text-align:center;"|
|-
| Best Pop Vocal Album
| 
|-
| rowspan="3" |"Hello"
| Record of the Year
| 
|-
| Song of the Year
| 
|-
| Best Pop Solo Performance
| 
|-
!scope="row" rowspan="7"| 2023
| rowspan="2"|30
| Album of the Year
| 
| rowspan="7" style="text-align:center;"|
|-
| Best Pop Vocal Album
| 
|-
| rowspan="4" |"Easy on Me"
| Record of the Year
| 
|-
| Song of the Year
| 
|-
| Best Pop Solo Performance
| 
|-
| Best Music Video
| 
|-
| rowspan="1" | Adele One Night Only
| Best Music Film
| 
|}

Guinness World Records
The Guinness World Records is a reference book published annually, listing world records and national records, both of human achievements and the extremes of the natural world. Adele currently holds 18 world records.

!
|-
!scope="row" rowspan="2"|2011
|rowspan="2"| Adele
|First female to have two singles and two albums in the UK top 5 simultaneously
|
|style="text-align:center;"|
|-
|First British artist to sell one million digital copies of a single in UK
|
|style="text-align:center;"|
|-
!scope="row" rowspan="10"| 2012
|rowspan="5"| 21
|First album in UK chart history to reach sales of three million in a calendar year
|
|style="text-align:center;" rowspan="3"|
|-
|Most consecutive weeks with UK No.1 album by a solo female (11)
|
|-
|Most cumulative weeks with UK No.1 album by a solo female (18)
|
|-
|Biggest-selling digital album in the UK
|
|style="text-align:center;" rowspan="6"|
|-
|Biggest-selling digital album in the US
|
|-
|"Rolling in the Deep"
|Biggest-selling digital track in a calendar year in the US
|
|-
|rowspan="4"| Adele
|First female artist to reach digital sales of one million in the US
|
|-
|First UK artist to reach digital sales of one million in the US
|
|-
|Fastest artist to reach digital sales of one million in the US
|
|-
|Most Grammy Awards won in a single year by a female artist 
|
|style="text-align:center;"|
|-
!scope="row"|2016
|"Hello"
|Fastest time for a video to reach one billion views on YouTube
|
|style="text-align:center;"|
|-
!scope="row" rowspan="2"|2021
|30
|Biggest-selling album worldwide 
|
|style="text-align:center;"|
|-
|"Easy on Me"
|Most streamed song in a single day on Spotify
|
|style="text-align:center;"|
|-
!scope="row" rowspan="3"|2022
|rowspan="3" |Adele
|Most Brit awards won for Album of the Year by a solo artist
|
|style="text-align:center;"|
|-
|Most Brit Awards won for Best British Single by a solo artist
|
|style="text-align:center;"|
|-
|Most Brit Awards won by a female artist 
|
|style="text-align:center;"|

Helpmann Awards
The Helpmann Awards recognise distinguished artistic achievement and excellence in Australia's live performing arts sectors. Adele has received one nomination.

!
|-
!scope="row"|2017
| Adele
| Best International Contemporary Concert
|
|align="center"|

Houston Film Critics Society
The Houston Film Critics Society is a non-profit film critic organised in Houston, Texas. Adele has received one award.

!
|-
!scope="row"| 2013
| "Skyfall"
| Best Original Song
| 
| style="text-align:center;"|
|}

IFPI Global Recording Artist Award
The IFPI Global Recording Artist of the Year Award honors the year's top artist across physical sales, downloads and streaming worldwide. Adele has received one award.

!
|-
!scope="row"| 2016
| Adele
| Global Recording Artist of 2015
| 
| style="text-align:center;"|
|}

iHeartRadio Music Awards
iHeartRadio Music Awards is a music awards show, founded by iHeartRadio in 2014, to recognise the most popular artists and music over the past year as determined by the network's listeners. Adele has received 5 awards out of 12 nominations.

!
|-
!scope="row" rowspan="5" |2016
| rowspan="2" |Adele
| Female Artist of the Year
| 
| rowspan="5" style="text-align:center;"|
|-
| Most Meme-able Moment
| 
|-
| rowspan="2" |"Hello"
 |Song of the Year
| 
|-
| Best Lyrics
| 
|-
| 25
| Album of the Year
| 
|-
!scope="row" rowspan="3" |2017
| Adele
| Female Artist of the Year
| 
| rowspan="3" style="text-align:center;"|
|-
| 25
| Pop Album of the Year
| 
|-
| "Send My Love (To Your New Lover)"
| Best Lyrics
| 
|-
!scope="row" rowspan="4"|2022
| rowspan="2"|30
| Best Comeback Album
| 
|-
| Album of the Year - Pop
| 
| rowspan="4" style="text-align:center;"|
|-
| rowspan="2" |"Easy on Me"
| Song of the Year 
| 
|-
| Best Lyrics
| 
|}

iHeartRadio Titanium Awards 
iHeartRadio Titanium Awards are awarded to an artist when their song reaches 1 Billion Spins across iHeartRadio Stations.

Independent Music Companies Association
The Independent Music Companies Association is selected annually by the IMPALA Independent Music Companies Association based on artistic merit alone, regardless of sales figures and publicity, from a nomination shortlist from which a jury then selects a winner. Adele has received one award.

!
|-
!scope="row"| 2011
| 21
| European Independent Album of the Year
| 
| style="text-align:center;"|
|}

Ivor Novello Awards
The Ivor Novello Awards are awarded for songwriting and composing. The awards, named after the Cardiff born entertainer Ivor Novello, are presented annually in London by the British Academy of Songwriters, Composers and Authors (BASCA). Adele has won 3 awards from 9 nominations.

!
|-
!scope="row" rowspan="5" |2012
| Adele
| Songwriter of the Year
| 
| rowspan="2" style="text-align:center;"|
|-
| rowspan="2" | "Rolling in the Deep"
| PRS for Music Most Performed Work
| 
|-
| Best Song Musically and Lyrically
| 
| rowspan="3" style="text-align:center;"|
|-
| "Someone like You"
| PRS for Music Most Performed Work
| 
|-
| 21
| Album of the Year
| 
|-
!scope="row"| 2016
| Adele
| Songwriter of the Year
| 
| style="text-align:center;"|
|-
!scope="row"| 2017
| "When We Were Young"
| PRS for Music Most Performed Work
| 
| style="text-align:center;"|
|-
!scope="row" rowspan="2" |2022
| "Easy on Me"
| Best Song Musically and Lyrically
| 
| rowspan="2" style="text-align:center;"|
|-
| Adele
| Songwriter of the Year
| 
|}

Juno Awards
The Juno Awards are presented annually to Canadian musical artists and bands to acknowledge their artistic and technical achievements in all aspects of music. New members of the Canadian Music Hall of Fame are also inducted as part of the awards ceremonies. Adele has received 2 awards from 3 nominations.

!
|-
! scope="row" |2012
| 21
| rowspan="3" |International Album of the Year
| 
| style="text-align:center;"|
|-
!scope="row" |2016
| 25
| 
| style="text-align:center;"|
|-
! scope="row" |2022
| 30
| 
| style="text-align:center;"|
|}

Latin American Music Awards
The Latin American Music Awards (Latin AMAs) is an annual American music award that is presented by Telemundo. It is the Spanish-language counterpart of the American Music Awards (AMAs) produced by the Dick Clark Productions. Adele has received 1 nomination.

!
|-
! scope="row"| 2016
| "Hello"
| Favorite Song – Crossover
| 
| align="center"|
|}

Los 40 Music Awards
Los 40 Music Awards, known as Los Premios 40 Principales before 2016, is an award show by the musical radio station Los 40, created in 2006 to celebrate the fortieth anniversary of its founding. Adele has won 1 award from 8 nominations.

!
|-
!scope="row"| 2012
| "Someone like You"
| Best International Song
| 
| style="text-align:center;"|
|-
!scope="row" rowspan="4"| 2016
| Adele
| Best International Artist
| 
| rowspan="4" style="text-align:center;"|
|-
| 25
| International Album of the Year
| 
|-
| "Hello"
| International Song of the Year
| 
|-
| Adele Live 2016
| Tour of the Year
| 
|-
!scope="row" rowspan="3"| 2022
| 30
| Best International Album
| 
| rowspan="3" style="text-align:center;"|
|-
| "Easy on Me"
| Best International Song
| 
|-
| "Oh My God"
| Best International Video
| 
|}

Mercury Prize
The Mercury Prize, formerly the Mercury Music Prize, is an annual music prize awarded for the best album from the United Kingdom or Ireland. Adele has been nominated twice.

!
|-
!scope="row"| 2008
| 19
| rowspan="2"|Album of the Year
| 
| style="text-align:center;"|
|-
!scope="row"| 2011
| 21
| 
| style="text-align:center;"|
|}

MOBO Awards
The Music of Black Origin Awards (MOBO), first presented in 1996, are held annually in the United Kingdom to recognise artists of any race or nationality who perform black music and "recognise the outstanding achievements of artists who perform music in genres ranging from Gospel, Jazz, RnB, Soul, Reggae to Hip Hop". Adele has received 1 award from 5 nominations.

!
|-
!scope="row"| 2008
| rowspan="3"| Adele
| Best UK Female
| 
| style="text-align:center;"| 
|-
!scope="row" rowspan="4"| 2011
| Best UK Act
| 
| rowspan="4" style="text-align:center;"|
|-
| Best UK R&B/Soul Act
| 
|-
| 21
| Best Album
| 
|-
| "Someone like You"
| Best Song
| 
|}

MuchMusic Video Awards
The MuchMusic Video Awards (also known as the MMVA or MMVAs) are annual awards presented by the Canadian music video channel MuchMusic to honour the year's best music videos. Adele has 4 nominations.

!
|-
!scope="row"| 2012
| rowspan="4" | Adele
| UR Fave Artist
| 
| style="text-align:center;"|
|-
!scope="row" rowspan="3"| 2016
| iHeartRadio International Artist of the Year
| 
| rowspan="3" style="text-align:center;"|
|-
| Most Buzzworthy International Artist of the Year
| 
|-
| Fan Fave Artist/Group
| 
|}

Music Business Association
The Music Business Association, (Music Biz) a non-profit membership organization established in 1958, advances and promotes music commerce. Adele has received one honour.

!
|-
!scope="row"|2017
| Adele
|Artist of the Year
|
| style="text-align:center;"|
|}

MTV

MTV Africa Music Awards
The MTV Africa Music Awards (also known as the MAMAs) were established in 2008 by MTV Networks Africa (now Viacom International Media Networks Africa) to celebrate the most popular contemporary music in Africa. Adele has been nominated once.

!
|-
!scope="row" |2016
| Adele
| Best International Act
|
| style="text-align:center;"|
|}

MTV Italy Awards
The MTV Italian Music Awards, also known as the MTV Awards, were established in 2006 by MTV Italy, to celebrate the most popular videos and artists in Italy. Adele has received 3 nominations.

!
|-
!scope="row"| 2012
| rowspan="2" | Adele || Wonder Woman Award || 
| style="text-align:center;"|
|-
!scope="row" rowspan="2"| 2016
| Best International Female || 
| rowspan="2" | 
|-
| "Hello" || Best Tormentone (catchphrase) || 
|}

MTV Europe Music Awards
The MTV Europe Music Awards were established in 1994 by MTV Networks Europe to celebrate the most popular music videos in Europe. Adele has received one award from twelve nominations.

!
|-
!scope="row"| 2008
| rowspan="4"| Adele
| rowspan="2"| Best UK & Ireland Act
| 
| style="text-align:center;"|
|-
!scope="row" rowspan="5"| 2011
| 
| rowspan="5" style="text-align:center;"|
|-
| Best European Act
| 
|-
| Best Female
| 
|-
| rowspan="2" | "Rolling in the Deep"
| Best Song
| 
|-
| Best Video
| 
|-
!scope="row" rowspan="4"| 2016
|rowspan="3"| Adele
| Best Female
| 
|rowspan="4" style="text-align:center;"|
|-
| Best Live Act
| 
|-
| Best UK & Ireland Act
| 
|-
| "Hello"
| Best Song
| 
|-
!scope="row" rowspan="2"| 2022
| rowspan= "2"| Adele
| Best Artist
| 
|-
| Best UK & Ireland Act
| 
|-
|}

MTV Video Music Awards
The MTV Video Music Awards were established in the end of the summer of 1984 by MTV to celebrate the top music videos of the year. Adele has received three awards from seventeen nominations.

!
|-
!scope="row"| 2008
| "Chasing Pavements"
| Best Choreography
| 
| style="text-align:center;"|
|-
!scope="row" rowspan="7"|2011
| rowspan="7" | "Rolling in the Deep"
| Video of the Year
| 
| rowspan="7" style="text-align:center;"|
|-
| Best Female Video
| 
|-
| Best Pop Video
| 
|-
| Best Direction
| 
|-
| Best Art Direction
| 
|-
| Best Cinematography
| 
|-
| Best Editing
| 
|-
!scope="row"| 2012
| "Someone like You"
| Best Cinematography
| 
| style="text-align:center;"|
|-
! scope="row" rowspan="8"| 2016
| rowspan="7"| "Hello"
| Video of the Year
| 
| rowspan="8" style="text-align:center;"|
|-
| Best Female Video
| 
|-
| Best Pop Video 
| 
|-
| Best Direction
| 
|-
| Best Art Direction 
| 
|-
| Best Cinematography
| 
|-
| Best Editing
| 
|-
| "Send My Love (To Your New Lover)"
| Best Visual Effects
| 
|-
!scope="row" rowspan="3"| 2022
| "Easy on Me"
| Song of the Year
| 
| rowspan="3" style="text-align:center;"|
|-
| "Oh My God"
| Best Art Direction
| 
|-
| 30
| Album of the Year 
| 
|}

MTV Video Music Brazil
Established in 1995, the MTV Video Music Brazil awards, commonly known as VMB, are MTV Brasil's annual award ceremony. Many award winners are chosen by MTV viewers. Adele has been nominated once.

!
|-
!scope="row"| 2011
| Adele
| Best International Act
| 
| style="text-align:center;"|
|}

MTV Video Music Awards Japan
The MTV Video Music Awards Japan are the Japanese version of the MTV Video Music Awards. Like the MTV Video Music Awards in the United States, in this event artists are awarded for their songs and videos through online voting from the same channel viewers. Adele has been nominated twice.

!
|-
!scope="row" rowspan="2"| 2016
| "Hello"
| Best International Female Video
| 
| rowspan="2" style="text-align:center;"|
|-
| 25
| Album of the Year
| 
|}

mtvU Woodie Awards
mtvU, a division of MTV Networks owned by Viacom, broadcasts a 24-hour television channel available on more than 750 college and university campuses across the United States. Adele has been nominated once.

!
|-
!scope="row"| 2008
| "Chasing Pavements"
| Best Video Woodie (Best Video of the Year)
| 
| style="text-align:center;"|
|}

NAACP Image Awards
An NAACP Image Award is an accolade presented by the National Association for the Advancement of Colored People to honour outstanding people of colour in film, television, music, and literature. Adele has been nominated twice.

!
|-
!scope="row" rowspan="2" | 2012
| rowspan="2" | "Someone like You"
| Outstanding Song
| 
| rowspan="2" style="text-align:center;"|
|-
| Outstanding Music Video
| 
|}

New Music Awards
The New Music Awards is an annual awards ceremony established in 2003 by New Music Weekly, honouring the achievements of established and independent artists, radio stations, record labels, and public relations. Adele has received one award. 

!
|-
!scope="row"|2022
| Easy On Me
| Top 40/CHR Song of the Year
| 
|style="text-align:center;"|
|}

Nickelodeon Kids' Choice Awards
The Nickelodeon Kids' Choice Awards is an annual awards show that airs on the Nickelodeon cable channel that honours the year's biggest television, film, and music acts, as voted by Nickelodeon viewers. Adele has won two awards from nine nominations.

!
|-
!scope="row"| 2013
| rowspan="2"| Adele
| rowspan="2"| Favorite Female Singer
| 
| style="text-align: center;" |
|-
!scope="row" rowspan="2"| 2016
| 
| rowspan="2" style="text-align: center;"|
|-
| "Hello"
| Favorite Song of the Year
| 
|-
! rowspan=2 scope="row"| 2017
| Adele
| Favorite Female Singer
| 
| rowspan="2" style="text-align: center;"|
|-
| "Send My Love (To Your New Lover)"
| Favorite Song
| 
|-
!scope="row" rowspan="4"|2022
| rowspan="2" |Adele
| Favorite Female Artist
| 
| rowspan="4" style="text-align: center;"|
|-
| Favorite Global Music Star 
| 
|-
| "Easy on Me" 
| Favorite Song
| 
|-
| 30
| Favorite Album 
| 
|}

Nickelodeon United Kingdom Kids' Choice Awards
The Nickelodeon UK Kids' Choice Awards (also known as the KCAs) is an annual awards show, similar to the American and Australian versions. Adele has won two awards from two nominations.

!
|-
!scope="row"| 2012
| rowspan="2"| Adele
| rowspan="2"| Best UK Female
| 
| style="text-align:center;"|
|-
!scope="row"| 2013
| 
| style="text-align:center;"|
|}

NME Awards
The NME Awards were created by the NME magazine and was first held in 1953. Adele has received one award from seven nominations.

!
|-
!scope="row"| 2012
| rowspan="3"| Adele
| Best Solo Artist
| 
| style="text-align:center;"|
|-
!scope="row" rowspan="3"| 2016
| Best British Solo Artist
| 
| rowspan="3"| 
|-
| Hero of the Year
| 
|-
| The Return Of Adele
| Music Moment of the Year
| 
|-
!scope="row" rowspan="3"| 2017
| rowspan="3"| Adele
| Best British Female
| 
| rowspan="3"| 
|-
| Best Festival Headliner
| 
|-
| Hero of the Year
| 
|}

NRJ Music Awards
The NRJ Music Awards, created in 2000 by the French radio station NRJ in partnership with the French television network TF1. Adele has received three awards from four nominations.

!
|-
!scope="row" rowspan="2" |2012
| Adele
| International Breakthrough of the Year
| 
| rowspan="2" style="text-align:center;"|
|-
| "Someone like You"
| International Song of the Year
| 
|-
!scope="row" |2013
| rowspan="2"| Adele
| International Female Artist of the Year
| 
| 
|-
!scope="row" |2015
| NRJ Artist of Honor
| 
| 
|}

People's Choice Awards
The People's Choice Awards is an American awards show recognising the people and the work of popular culture. The show has been held annually since 1975 and is voted on by the general public. Adele has won one award from twelve nominations.

!
|-
!scope="row" rowspan="4"|2012
| Adele
| Favorite Female Artist
| 
| rowspan="4" style="text-align:center;"|
|-
| 21
| Favorite Album of the Year
| 
|-
| rowspan="2"|"Rolling in the Deep"
| Favorite Song of the Year
| 
|-
| Favorite Music Video
| 
|-
!scope="row" rowspan="2"|2013
| rowspan="4"| Adele
| Favorite Female Artist
| 
| rowspan="2" style="text-align:center;"|
|-
| Favorite Pop Artist
| 
|-
!scope="row" rowspan="3"| 2017
| Favorite Female Artist
| 
| rowspan="3" align="center"| 
|-
| Favorite Pop Artist
| 
|-
| James Corden's Carpool Karaoke with Adele
| Favorite Comedic Collaboration
| 
|-
!scope="row" rowspan="3"|2021
| Adele
| Favorite Female Artist
| 
| rowspan="3" style="text-align:center;"|
|-
| rowspan="2"|"Easy on Me"
| Favorite Song of the Year
| 
|-
| Favorite Music Video
| 
|-
|}

Pollstar Awards
Pollstar is a trade publication for the concert tour industry. It gets its information primarily from the agents, managers and promoters who produce concerts. Pollstar holds an annual award ceremony to honor artists and professionals in the concert industry. Adele has received one award from two nominations..

!
|-
!scope="row" rowspan="2"| 2016
| rowspan="2" | Adele
| Major Tour of the Year
| 
| rowspan="2" style="text-align:center;"|
|-
| Most Creative Stage Production
| 
|}

Premios Juventud
Premios Juventud (Youthfulness Awards) is an awards show for Spanish-speaking celebrities in the areas of film, music, sports, fashion, and pop culture, presented by the television network Univision. Winners are determined by online vote at univision.com. Adele has won twice out of three nominations.

!
|-
!scope="row"| 2013
| rowspan="2"| Adele
| rowspan="2"| Favorite Hitmaker
| 
|style="text-align:center;"|
|-
!scope="row" rowspan="2"| 2016
| 
| rowspan="2" style="text-align:center;"|
|-
| "Hello"
| Favorite Hit
| 
|}

Premios Odeón
The Premios Odeón Awards are a series of awards given annually by the Asociación de Gestión de Derechos Intelectuales (AGEDI) to honour the achievements of Spanish music. Adele has won one award from two nominations. 

!
|-
!scope="row" rowspan="2" |2022
| 30
| Best International Album 
| 
| style="text-align:center;" rowspan="2"|
|-
| Adele
| Odeon International Artist
| 
|}

Premios Oye!
Premios Oye! are presented annually by the Academia Nacional de la Música en México for outstanding achievements in Mexican record industry. Adele has won two awards.

!
|-
!scope="row"|2012
| 21
| rowspan="2"|Álbum en inglés
| 
| style="text-align:center;"|
|-
!scope="row"| 2013
|| Live at the Royal Albert Hall
| 
|style="text-align:center;"|
|}

Q Awards
The Q Awards are the United Kingdom's annual music awards run by the music magazine Q to honour musical excellence. Winners are voted by readers of Q online, with others decided by a judging panel. Adele has received two awards from six nominations.

!
|-
!scope="row"| 2008
| rowspan="2"| Adele
| Breakthrough Artist
| 
| style="text-align:center;"|
|-
!scope="row" rowspan="3"|2011
| Best Female Artist
| 
| rowspan="2" style="text-align:center;"|
|-
| "Rolling in the Deep"
| rowspan="2"| Best Track
| 
|-
| "Someone like You"
| 
| style="text-align:center;"|
|-
!scope="row"| 2012
| rowspan="2"| Adele
| Best Solo Artist
| 
| style="text-align:center;"|
|-
!scope="row"| 2017
| Best Act In The World
| 
| style="text-align:center;"|
|}

Radio Disney Music Awards
The Radio Disney Music Awards (RDMA) is an annual awards show which is operated and governed by Radio Disney, an American radio network. Beginning in 2013, the ceremony began to be televised on Disney Channel. Adele has been nominated twice.

!
|-
!scope="row" rowspan="2"| 2016
| Adele
| She's The One – Best Female Artist
| 
| rowspan="2" style="text-align:center;"|
|-
| "Hello"
| Heartbreak – Best Breakup Song
| 
|}

Satellite Awards
The Satellite Awards are an annual award given by the International Press Academy. Adele has been nominated once.

!
|-
!scope="row"| 2012
| "Skyfall"
| Best Original Song
| 
|style="text-align:center;"|
|}

Shorty Awards
The Shorty Awards honor the best of social media by recognizing the influencers, brands and organizations on social media. Adele has won once.

!
|-
!scope="row"| 2016
| Adele
| Arts & Entertainment: Musician
| 
| style="text-align:center;"|
|}

Soul Train Music Awards
The Soul Train Music Awards are produced by the makers of Soul Train to honour entertainers. Adele has been nominated five times.

!
|-
!scope="row" rowspan="3"| 2011
| 21
| Album of the Year
| 
| rowspan="3" style="text-align:center;"|
|-
| rowspan="2"| "Rolling in the Deep"
| The Ashford & Simpson Songwriter's Award
| 
|-
| rowspan="2"| Song of the Year
| 
|-
!scope="row" rowspan="2"| 2016
| rowspan="2" | "Hello"
| 
| rowspan="2" style="text-align:center;"|
|-
| Ashford & Simpson Songwriter's Award
| 
|}

South Bank Sky Arts Awards
The South Bank Show is a television arts magazine show that was produced by ITV between 1978 and 2010, and by Sky Arts from 2012. Adele has been nominated once.

!
|-
!scope="row"| 2012
| Adele
| Pop Music
| 
| style="text-align:center;"|
|}

Space Shower Music Awards
The Space Shower Music Awards are an annual set of Japanese music awards sponsored by Space Shower TV.

!
|-
!scope="row"| 2016
| Adele
| Best International Artist.
| 
| style="text-align:center;"|
|}

Swiss Music Awards
The Swiss Music Awards were established in 2008 and initially organised by IFPI to celebrate Swiss and international artists. Since 2022, it has been organised by CH Media. Adele has received four awards from four nominations. 

!
|-
!scope="row" rowspan="2" |2012
| "Rolling in the Deep" 
| Best International Hit
| 
| rowspan="2" style="text-align:center;"|
|-
| 21
| Best International Pop/Rock Album
| 
|-
!scope="row" rowspan="2" |2016
| Adele
| Best International Act
| 
| rowspan="2" style="text-align:center;"|
|-
| 25
| Best International Album
| 
|}

Teen Choice Awards
The Teen Choice Awards is an annual awards show that airs on the Fox Network. The awards honour the year's biggest achievements in music, films, sports, television, fashion and other categories, voted by teenage viewers. Adele has been nominated six times.

!
|-
!scope="row" rowspan="3"|2011
| rowspan="2"| Adele
| Choice Breakout Artist
| 
| rowspan="3" style="text-align:center;"|
|-
| Choice Music Female Artist
| 
|-
| "Rolling in the Deep"
| Choice Break-Up Song
| 
|-
!scope="row" rowspan="2"|2012
| Adele
| Choice Music Female Artist
| 
| rowspan="2" style="text-align:center;"|
|-
| "Set Fire to the Rain"
| rowspan="2"| Choice Music Single – Female
| 
|-
!scope="row"|2016
| "Hello"
| 
| style="text-align:center;"|
|}

UK Music Video Awards
The UK Music Video Awards is an annual award ceremony founded in 2008 to recognise creativity, technical excellence and innovation in music videos and moving images for music. Adele has received two awards from seven nominations.

!
|-
!scope="row"| 2008
| "Chasing Pavements"
| General Video Categories − People's Choice Award 
| 
|style="text-align:center;"|
|-
!scope="row" rowspan="3"| 2011
| rowspan="3"| "Rolling in the Deep"
| Best Pop Video − UK 
| 
| rowspan="2" style="text-align:center;"|
|-
| Best Cinematography in a Video
| 
|-
| Best Art Direction and Design in a Video
| 
|style="text-align:center;"|
|-
!scope="row"| 2016
| "Hello"
| Best Pop Video − UK
| 
|style="text-align:center;"|
|-
!scope="row" rowspan="2"| 2022
| rowspan="2"| "Oh My God"
| Best Pop Video − UK
| 
| rowspan="2" style="text-align:center;"|
|-
| Best Production Design in a Video 
| 
|}

Urban Music Awards
The Urban Music Awards is a British awards ceremony launched in 2003 to recognise the achievement of urban-based artists, producers, nightclubs, DJs, radio stations, and record labels. Adele has received one award from four nominations.

!
|-
!scope="row" rowspan="2"| 2008
| rowspan="3"| Adele
| Best Jazz Act
| 
| style="text-align:center;"|
|-
| Best Neo Soul Act
| 
| style="text-align:center;"|
|-
!scope="row" rowspan="2"| 2011
| Best Female Artist
| 
| rowspan="2" style="text-align:center;"|
|-
| 21
| Best Album
| 
|}

World Music Awards
The World Music Awards is an annual international awards show founded in 1989 that honours recording artists based on worldwide sales figures provided by the International Federation of the Phonographic Industry (IFPI). Adele has been nominated four times.

!
|-
!scope="row" rowspan="4"| 2014
| rowspan="2"| Adele
| World's Best Female Artist
| 
| style="text-align:center;" rowspan=4|
|-
| World's Best Entertainer of the Year
| 
|-
| 21
| World's Best Album
| 
|-
| "Rumour Has It"
| World's Best Song
| 
|}

World Soundtrack Awards
The World Soundtrack Awards are presented by World Soundtrack Academy to honour accomplishment in film music. Adele has received one award.

!
|-
!scope="row"| 2013
| "Skyfall"
| Best Original Song Written Directly for a Film
| 
| style="text-align:center;"|
|}

ZD Awards 
Zvukovaya Dorozhka ("sound track") is  Russia's oldest hit parade in field of popular music. Since 2003 it is presented in a ceremony in concert halls. It's considered one of the major Russian music awards.

!
|-
!scope="row" |2015
| Herself
| Best Foreign Act
| 
| style="text-align:center;" |
|}

Žebřík Music Awards
Žebřík Music Awards is a music award given to the best musicians and bands in the Czech Republic. It has been awarded annually since 1992 and organized and presented by iReport, a music and style magazine. 

!
|-
!scope="row" rowspan="3" |2022
| Adele
| Best Foreign Singer (1st)
| 
| rowspan="3" style="text-align:center;" |
|-
| "Easy on Me"
| Best Foreign Composition (2nd)
| 
|-
| 30
| Best Foreign Album (3rd)
| 
|}

Other accolades

State honours

References

Awards and nominations
Adele